Metacmaeops vittata is a species of beetle in the family Cerambycidae, the only species in the genus Metacmaeops. This beetle is distributed in United States.

References

Lepturinae